The 1894 Bilbao students v British workers was a football match that took place at the Hippodrome of Lamiako, Leioa, on 3 May 1894. The match was contested by a group of Bilbainos who challenged the British residents in Bilbao to a football match, which at the time was a relatively unknown sport in Spain. The game was won comfortably by the British 5–0, but most important than the result was its historical significance, as it was probably one of the first ‘international’ matches in the history of the sport.

Background
These first matches were held on a field known as La Campa de los Ingleses, but it was in the Campo de Lamiako where football took off in Bilbao, with several Bilbainos swarming the field to watch the teams of British workers challenge each other every weekend, and inevitably, the local citizens began to play this sport as well. Some of these locals were Basques of well-off families who had studied in the United Kingdom and became fond of football there, and who upon their return to Bilbao felt the need to practice this sport.

In the spring of 1894, a group of young students who were enthusiastic about this new sport was brave enough to challenge the clearly superior British people of Bilbao. The local newspaper Noticiero Bilbaíno published said "challenge" in April, challenging the English residents in Bilbao to play a football match and they did not take long to respond, accepting it. The game was held on the Hippodrome of Lamiako, a horse racing course just outside of the city, located in the  neighborhood of Leioa. The match was agreed to take place at half past ten in the morning of 3 May 1894.

Overview
Admission was free and there were plenty of curious friends of the town's football players. The Bilbao students wore white shirts and the British workers wore cream-colored. Some of the figures who started for the British that day were players from Club Atleta, such as the goalkeeper George Baird, Rearey, Armstrong, and Brand. The referee was a certain M. R. Hendry.

The English choose the field with their backs to the sun, and from the first moment, they dominated. The Bilbao midfield, who played a lot, was containing the British and this excited the people from Bilbao, but the Britons reacted, they were stronger and easily outplayed the people from Bilbao. The English scored two early goals, but a section of the public was not satisfied with the British more physical approach and protested, and some of them decided to invade the field. The local players appease their friends and convince them that the English were doing the right thing.

In the first half, the English were winning by three to nil, and at the break, the British gifted them eleven roasted chickens. It still is unknown whether that was just a display of courtesy or rather strategy. The break was prolonged more than necessary due to the after-meal and the digestion of the chickens. When the game resumed, the English scored a couple more goals to seal a clear victory. The score is not clear, it seems that it was 5–0 although it can also be read as 6–0 in some chronicles.

Final details

|valign="top" width="50%"|

|}

Aftermath
The local newspapers, still quite unsure of how the rules of the sport worked, reported that the Englishmen had won by ‘five points’. After the match, the Brits brought the beaten team roasted chickens as a consolation for the heavy defeat, and a prize out of respect for the audacity of the challenge.

The result did not discourage the local population, who continued their newfound love affair with the British sport, which was particularly popular among these Basque students who returned from the United Kingdom, in fact, this match coincided with the creation of the Zamacois Gymnastic Society, which was opened in Bilbao in that same year, 1894, by a group of enthusiastic sportsmen led by the gymnast José Zamacois Bengoa, a gym which would later be the catalyst for the founding of Athletic Bilbao.

See also
History of Athletic Bilbao

Notes

References

Sport in Bilbao
1890s in Spanish sport
1894 in association football
1894 in European football
May 1894 sports events
19th century in Spain